DYXX-TV (channel 6) is a television station in Iloilo City, Philippines, airing programming from the GMA network. It is owned and operated by the network's namesake corporate parent alongside GTV outlet DYKV-TV (channel 28). The station maintains studios and hybrid analog/digital transmitting facility at the GMA Compound, Phase 5, Alta Tierra Village, MacArthur Drive, Barangay Quintin Salas, Jaro, Iloilo City.

History
 1967 – DYXX-TV Channel 6 was launched by the Associated Broadcasting Corporation (now TV5 Network Inc.) until Marcos declared Martial Law in 1972.
 1974 – DYXX-TV Channel 6 was reopened and became an affiliate station of Republic Broadcasting System under Asian-Pacific Broadcasting Company. At the same time, the station's own variation of GMA Radio-Television Arts ident aside from sporting a light blue square logo with the network name in white, also had a circle 6 logo in use, in its final years the blue circle 6 logo used was similar to those used by the ABC in some cities of the U.S.
 February 1987 – DYXX-TV upgrading into an originating station with its first local newscast "Banat" as a local version of "GMA Balita" from the national GMA 7.
 January 1988 – The station launched first live coverage of Dinagyang Festival in Freedom Grandstand, Iloilo City.
November 12, 1990- The station's broadcast complex was badly damaged by flood after Typhoon Ruping (international name: Typhoon Mike) made a landfall in Iloilo City.  The station's transmitter also collapsed, rendering GMA TV-6 and radio stations DYMK and DYXX inoperable for a short period.  All television and radio operations were resumed after a month when a new transmitter was constructed.  
First Quarter 1992 - DYXX-TV began broadcasting live programming from Manila.
 April 30, 1992 – DYXX-TV officially introduced the Rainbow Satellite Network which commences its satellite broadcast from the flagship station in Manila to viewers in the Western Visayas, following the network's utilizes a new logo to correspond with the rebranding and a satellite-beaming rainbow in a multicolored striped based on the traditional scheme of red, orange, yellow, green, blue, indigo and violet, with GMA in a metallic form using a Futura Black fontface, and analogous gloominess of Indigo as its fonts in the letters.
 May 16, 1996 – RBS formally changed its corporate name to GMA Network Inc., with GMA now standing for Global Media Arts.
 July 1998 – GMA Channel 6 increased its transmitting power to 10,000 watts, and later upgraded their studio facilities & equipment and increase power to 30,000 watts with a new tower in Jordan, Guimaras in January 1999.
 October 1999 – The station launched its local news program "Ratsada" and variety show "Bongga!".
 November 2001 – "Bongga!" won the Best Regional Variety Show award at KBP Golden Dove Awards.
 September 2005 – GMA Iloilo drew a record crowd of 60,000 at the Iloilo Sports Complex during the first Grand Kapuso Fans Day in Iloilo.  Noontime shows "Bongga!" and "Eat Bulaga!" were aired live from the venue.
 January 2006 – "Ratsada" and "Bongga!" were re-launched and were taken under the wing of GMA News and Public Affairs and GMA Entertainment TV group respectively.
 October 2007 – The new studio building along GMA Compound in MacArthur Road, Jaro, Iloilo City was opened and TV 13 Bacolod was relaunch as its repeater station with a power of 500 watts in Sipalay and Bacolod.
 February 2008 – "Istayl Naton" (Our Style), a new show by GMA Entertainment TV Group in Western Visayas is launched.
 October 2009 – GMA Iloilo celebrated its 10th year in the business with an outreach program and a big concert at SM City Iloilo Carpark. Rhian Ramos, Glaiza de Castro and Akihiro Sato were the Kapuso celebrities who attended the said events.
 October 2010 – GMA News & Public Affairs Iloilo launched "Ilonggo Isyu Subong", a one-hour public affairs show about the topics and issues around Iloilo City.
 September 19, 2011 – GMA Entertainment Television in Iloilo launched Araguy ("It hurts you know"), a new show which features Ilonggo and canned funny videos hosted by Papa Prince, Papa Jim and Papa Sang of Talk to Papa on 93.5 Ayos! (now Barangay FM 93.5).
 November 10, 2014 – GMA News & Public Affairs Iloilo relaunched Ratsada as "24 Oras Western Visayas".
 July 20, 2015 – GMA News & Public Affairs Iloilo relaunched 24 Oras Western Visayas again as "Ratsada 24 Oras".
 November 13, 2015 – GMA Network decided to cancel airing Ratsada 24 Oras following the retrenchment of 20 employees from the news department as part of the strategic streamlining undertaken by the network. The station is now downgraded as a relay (satellite-selling) station.
 August 27, 2018 – GMA Iloilo re-upgrading back to an originating station with the launching of regional newscast "One Western Visayas".
 June 29, 2020 – GMA Iloilo temporarily took over the broadcast of GMA Cebu with One Western Visayas airing in Cebu and the rest of Central and Eastern Visayas due to the Enhanced Community Quarantine in Cebu City. The setup ended on July 10.
 August 31, 2020 – Five years after the cancellation of morning show Arangkada, GMA Iloilo launched a new morning show GMA Regional TV Early Edition.
 August 2, 2021 – GMA Iloilo commenced digital test broadcasts on UHF Channel 29 covering Metro Iloilo and the provinces of Iloilo and Guimaras.

GMA TV-6 Iloilo currently airing programs
 Dinagyang Festival (Annually, every 4th Sunday of January)
 GMA Regional TV Early Edition (co-produced by GMA Bacolod)
 One Western Visayas (co-produced by GMA Bacolod)
 Word of God Network

GMA TV-6 Iloilo previously aired programs
 24 Oras Western Visayas
 300 Seconds
 Arangkada
 Araguy
 Banat 
 Bantay
 Bongga!
 Istayl Naton
 Ilonggo Isyu Subong
 Kape at Balita
 Let's Fiesta
 Ratsada (1999-2015)
 Ratsada 24 Oras
 Saksi sa Western Visayas (simulcast on TV-10 (now TV-13) Bacolod)
 The Ilonggo Agenda (special programing for 2010 elections)
 Tok! Tok! Tok! Kwarta Pasok!
 Visita Iglesia

Digital television

Digital channels
UHF Channel 29 (563.143 MHz)

Area of coverage

Primary areas 
 Iloilo City
 Iloilo
 Guimaras

Secondary areas 
 Bacolod
 Portion of Negros Occidental

Rebroadcasters

Since the return of GMA Iloilo as an originating station last August 27, 2018, the operations of GMA Bacolod (TV-13/30 Bacolod and TV-10 Sipalay) was absorbed by GMA Iloilo which led to simulcast One Western Visayas and other regional interstitial, as well as some of the editorial and reportorial staff are employed by the latter. GMA Bacolod was previously an originating station from 2010 to 2015, with its former program Isyu Subong Negrense.

Personalities

Present 
 Jonathan Cabillon (station manager for GMA Regional TV Western Visayas)
 Kaitlene Rivilla as Co-Anchor of One Western Visayas and Co-Host of GMA Regional TV Early Edition.
 Joecel Huesca
 Julius Belaca-Ol 
 Rudje Mar Sucaldito
 Ashley Liza
 Darylle Marie Sarmiento as Regional News Correspondent of One Western Visayas
 John Sala as Regional News Correspondent of One Western Visayas
 Zen Quilantang as Regional News Correspondent of One Western Visayas and the National News Anchor of GMA Regional TV News.

Past 
 Gerthrode Charlotte Tan-Mabilog
 Jonathan Gellangarin (now with DYSI)
 Mark Nunieza (now with DYRI RMN 774 Iloilo)
 Atty. Jobert Peñaflorida
 Atty. Sedfrey Cabaluna
 Jeja Rose Pornan
 Noly Calvo
 Chris Misajon†
 Alvin Dennis Arabang
 Fabienne Paderes (now with DYSI)
 Alessa Quimsing
 Enrico Surita Jr. (now with DYSI)
 Charlene Belvis - Gador
 Nenita Hobilla
 Jason Gregorio
 Jowelie Docdocil
 Juan Manuel Dela Cena 
 Jennifer Munieza-Jumaquio
 Mavic Tse Wing
 Bernard Bernal
 Samantha Jalandoni
 Kate Chaves
 Jovani Gustilo
 Carol Velagio
 Eddie Laczi
 Susan Pastrana
 Elizabeth Vargas
 John Arceo
 Angelia Ong
 Dino Vasquez
 Jigo Mambo
 Leez Quimpo
 Em Capalla
 Joan Jalandoni

See also
 List of GMA Network stations
 List of television and radio stations in Iloilo City
 DYMK-FM
 DYSI

References

Television stations in Iloilo City
GMA Network stations
Television channels and stations established in 1967
Digital television stations in the Philippines